Ardmore is an unincorporated community in Portage Township, St. Joseph County, in the U.S. state of Indiana.

History
The community's name may be a transfer from Ardmore, Pennsylvania.

Geography

References

Unincorporated communities in St. Joseph County, Indiana
Unincorporated communities in Indiana